Lee Hyun-wook (born June 17, 1985) is a South Korean actor. He is best known for his roles in the television series Hell Is Other People (2019), Mine (2021) and Remarriage & Desires (2022).

Early life and education
Lee Hyun-wook became interested in acting when he was in middle school. His parents were against it but his grandmother helped him enroll in an acting academy.

Lee graduated from Anyang Arts High School and Korea National University of Arts.

Career
Lee Hyun-wook started his acting career playing in short films: Repatriation (2000), The Camel (2008), Thorn Hearted (2010) and The Out Boxer (2011). The latter earned him the Face in Shorts Award at the 10th Asiana International Short Film Festival in 2012.

In 2013, Lee was appointed special jury member of the 11th Asiana International Short Film Festival alongside Lee Jung-jae.

In 2014, Lee made his television debut in the action-thriller series Three Days as the right-hand man of Choi Won-young's character. Two months later, he made his commercial film debut in The Target which was screened at the 2014 Cannes Film Festival. The same year, he was chosen among 400 candidates to play Choi Yoo-bin in the daily drama Only Love.

In 2015, Lee made his theater debut in True West, playing the main character Austin. He reprised his role the following year before playing Stephen in Old Wicked Songs. His performance earned him the New Actor Award at the 2016 Stagetalk Audience Choice Awards. The same year, he took on the role of a detective in the crime television series Mrs. Cop 2 and appeared in the film No Tomorrow.

In 2017, Lee played Min-wook in the play Judo Boy. The same year, he played two brothers in the web series Fake. In May 2018, Lee signed an exclusive contract with Management Air. In October 2018, he started playing Bob in Toc Toc, a role which he reprised in September 2019 for a two-day performance in Gunpo.

In 2019, Lee played Oliver in the play The Pride. He was also cast as a resident of Eden Dormitory in the psychological thriller Hell Is Other People, making it his first small screen role since his military discharge and for which he was nominated in the Capability Award category at the 1st OCN Awards. Later that year, he made a guest appearance in the tenth episode of Pegasus Market which stars his close friend Lee Dong-hwi.

In 2020, Lee appeared in the films Secret Zoo and #Alive. He then played a missionary in the first three episodes of The Good Detective. He was also cast in his first main role in a television series, playing a lieutenant in the military thriller Search.

In 2021, Lee starred in the romantic-comedy She Would Never Know alongside Won Jin-ah and Rowoon. He also starred in the highly anticipated tvN drama Mine as the husband of actress Lee Bo-young's character. He also appeared in the TVING Original movie Shark: The Beginning as Hyun Woo-yong and will reprise his role in the follow-up web series, Shark: The Storm.

At the 58th Baeksang Arts Awards, Lee was nominated for Best Supporting Actor in a Korean drama for his role as Han Ji-yong in Mine.

In 2022, Lee starred in the Netflix original series Remarriage & Desires as one of the main characters.

Filmography

Film

Television series

Web series

Stage

Awards and nominations

References

External links
 
 

1985 births
Living people
People from Icheon
Anyang Arts High School alumni
Korea National University of Arts alumni
South Korean male film actors
South Korean male stage actors
South Korean male television actors
21st-century South Korean male actors